Lajoš Jakovetić (45 November 1922 - 27 January 2003) was a Serbian, Yugoslavia international, football player and manager.

Playing career
He started playing in the youth teams of his home town club FK Bačka 1901. He represented the region of Vojvodina at the first season that was played after the end of the Second World War, that was played in a particular way, being the players distributed by the internal republics and autonomous provinces. That was the only season played in that peculiar way, returning the league to its normal clubs format in the next, 1946-47 season. He was playing in his hometown club Spartak Subotica. In 1948, he moved to Partizan where he played until 1952, having won the 1948–49 championship. Afterwards, he returned to Spartak where he played until 1957, when he ended his playing career.

National team
After having moved to Partizan, he played for the Yugoslav national team four times. His debut was on 21 August 1949 in Belgrade against Israel (a 6-0 win) and his last match was on 13 November of the same year, also in Belgrade, against Austria (this time a 5-2 defeat).

Manager career
He was the manager of the club where he started and ended his playing career, Spartak Subotica, having managed to take them to the 1962 Yugoslav Cup final where they lost 4-1 against the much bigger OFK Belgrade. Until today, that is considered to be one of the greatest achievements of Spartak Subotica.

Honours

Player
Partizan
Yugoslav First League (1): 1948-49

References

External links
 Profile at Serbian Federation website
 
 

2003 deaths
1922 births
Sportspeople from Subotica
Serbian footballers
Serbian football managers
Yugoslav football managers
Yugoslav footballers
Yugoslavia international footballers
FK Bačka 1901 players
FK Spartak Subotica players
FK Partizan players
Yugoslav First League players
Association football defenders